Natzwiller is a commune in the Bas-Rhin department in Grand Est in northeastern France.

History

Built in spring 1941 on the territory of the commune, Natzweiler-Struthof concentration camp opened for prisoners in May 1941. It was the only Nazi concentration camp on French soil. The inmates originally were German who were to supply labor for building V-2 rocket factories in man-made caves dug out of the Vosges Mountains.

The prisoners lived in the cold, damp tunnels as they built them. The camp was expanded by the Nazis with the installation of a gas chamber in April 1943 and crematorium. Its main function was temporary detention of Resistance fighters from overrun European nations, although some Nazi experiments on Jews were carried out at the camp.

Museum

The camp site has been preserved as a museum and includes a monument to the departed.

See also
 Communes of the Bas-Rhin department

References

Communes of Bas-Rhin
Bas-Rhin communes articles needing translation from French Wikipedia